The Irish Republic is a history book written by Dorothy Macardle, first published in 1937, which covers the formation and existence of the Irish Republic, the Irish War of Independence, the Anglo-Irish Treaty and the Irish Civil War, a period which covered from 1919–1923.

The book, which was first published in 1937, usefully analyses the period from an Irish republican, pro-Éamon de Valera perspective. Though sometimes disputing aspects of its analysis, the book, along with Frank Pakenham's Peace by Ordeal, is regarded within universities as elementary reading for students studying the period and features on most course reading lists.

Among the reasons are:

 The author personally knew, and was friendly with, many of the people she was writing about; among those who she thanked in the acknowledgements were Seán T. O'Kelly, Oscar Traynor, Thomas Derrig, Seán MacBride, and the widows of Austin Stack and Erskine Childers. As a result, she knew from personal experience their private views and opinions, not just those expressed publicly.
 She had been an activist with the republican movement during the period, serving in Cumann na mBan, being held in Mountjoy and Kilmainham Gaols during the Civil War. Thus she had an insider's perspective on the movement.
 It reflects the perspective of Anti-Treaty republicans. Later books were less sympathetic to the Anti-Treaty side, given the widespread belief, even expressed by de Valera at the end of his life, that opposition to the Treaty was in retrospect a mistake.

Macardle willed the royalties from the book, which has regularly been reprinted, to her close friend Éamon de Valera, who wrote the book's foreword. The book's political allegiances were demonstrated unmistakably when a studio portrait of de Valera featured on the front page of some editions.

Other historians such as Patrick Murray have found that the book's outline was substantially laid down by de Valera to create a continuous justification of his political views from 1916 to 1936, that was then fleshed out by Macardle.

De Valera said it was "the only really authoritative account of the period 1916–26"

Notes

Further reading
 Dorothy Macardle, The Irish Republic (Corgi edition, 1968)
 Tim Pat Coogan, Éamon de Valera

1937 non-fiction books
History books about Ireland